Isometrus thwaitesi is a species of scorpion in the family Buthidae endemic to Sri Lanka.

Description
Total length is 30 to 50 mm. Manus of pedipalp is very thin. Pedipalps and legs are yellowish, with spots. Fingers and manus of pedipalps are yellowish, and spotted. Mesosomal segments are light-colored. Subaculear tooth is spinoid. There are 13 to 16 pectinal teeth. Hemispermatophore trunk is broad, and short. Capsule region is broad. Flagellum laminiform, short, and basally broadened. Median lobe of hemispermatophore is narrow, and distally truncate, with strong, curved dorsal carina.

References

Animals described in 1897
thwaitesi